Kingsgate is a hamlet in St Peter's parish, Broadstairs, Kent. The name Kingsgate is related to an incidental landing of Charles II on 30 June 1683 (‘gate’ referring to a cliff-gap) though other English monarchs have also used this cove, such as George II in 1748. Kingsgate is the location of Holland House built between 1762 and 1768 by Henry Fox, 1st Baron Holland, of Holland House in Kensington, which was accessed from the beach through a stone arched gate originally named Barthelmas Gate and renamed later to Kings Gate. Holland House in Kent was sold by his third son Charles James Fox and in due course subdivided and further developed. On either end of the cliffs above Kingsgate Bay Lord Holland built what is now the Captain Digby Public House and Kingsgate Castle. This last was never a real castle and was one of several follies in the grounds of Holland House and, indeed its stable block, before further redevelopment, allowing it to become the residence of John Lubbock, 1st Baron Avebury.

References

External links

Letter from (T. Pelham-Holles) 4th Duke of Newcastle-upon-Tyne (later 1st Duke of Newcastle-under-Lyne), Kingsgate, near Margate, Kent, to Henry Pelham, 22 November 1748

Thanet
Populated coastal places in Kent
Beaches of Kent